= 1951 Ålandic legislative election =

Legislative elections were held in Åland in 1951.

== Results ==
Party	Votes	%
Aländska valförbundet (Ålänningarnas valförbund)	5,294	94.96
Folkdemokraterna	281	5.04
Total	5,575	100.00
